Idaea serpentata, the ochraceous wave, is a moth of the family Geometridae. The species was first described by Johann Siegfried Hufnagel in 1767. It is found in most of continental Europe and the Near East.

The wingspan is about 22 mm. The adults fly from late June to early August. They are attracted to light.

The larvae feed on various herbaceous plants such as Galium, Taraxacum, Rumex and Thymus.

Notes
The flight season refers to Belgium. This may vary in other parts of the range.

External links

Ochraceous wave at UKMoths
Fauna Europaea
Lepiforum e.V.

Sterrhini
Moths of Europe
Moths of Asia
Moths described in 1767
Taxa named by Johann Siegfried Hufnagel